This article lists the films composed by Ilaiyaraaja in the 1970s..

Ilaiyaraaja 1976

Ilaiyaraaja 1977

Ilaiyaraaja 1978

Ilaiyaraaja 1979

Decade-wise statistics

Bibliography

References

External links
 
 Raaja.com: The official Internet website of Ilaiyaraaja

Discographies of Indian artists